Wilson is a 1944 biographical film about the 28th American President Woodrow Wilson. Shot in Technicolor and directed by Henry King, the film stars Alexander Knox, Charles Coburn, Geraldine Fitzgerald, Thomas Mitchell, Ruth Nelson, Sir Cedric Hardwicke, Vincent Price, William Eythe and Mary Anderson.

A deep admirer of Wilson, distributor 20th Century Fox president Darryl F. Zanuck personally oversaw production. Character actor Knox was given one of his few chances to play a lead.

Wilson received critical acclaim, earning ten nominations at the 17th Academy Awards and winning five, including Best Writing, Original Screenplay. However, it was a box office bomb due to its unusually high budget. This upset Zanuck to the point that for years, he forbade employees from mentioning the film in his presence.

Plot 
In 1909, Woodrow Wilson is the President of Princeton University and the author of several books on the democratic process. The local Democratic Party political machine convinces him to run for Governor of New Jersey; after he wins the election in 1910, Wilson proves himself independent of the machine and its interests, fighting for progressive causes.

The U.S. is going through a progressive change in national politics and a split is developing in the Republican Party, providing a chance for Wilson to win on the Democratic ticket. He receives the party's nomination and wins the Presidency in 1912. He pushes through a series of programs, called 'The New Freedom'. When World War I breaks out in Europe in 1914, Wilson tries to keep the U.S. neutral. At the same time, his wife Ellen dies of Bright's disease.

Early in 1915, at around the same time of the sinking of the RMS Lusitania, he meets Edith Bolling Galt, a Washington D.C. widow, whom he marries in December 1915. He wins reelection in 1916, and as he starts his second term, the war finally comes to America. In 1918, the Allies defeat the Central Powers, and Wilson travels to France to have a hand in the Paris Peace Conference. He intends to establish his long-promised League of Nations, but many Republican senators, including Henry Cabot Lodge, feel the President is leaving the United States vulnerable to future wars, and decide to veto whatever treaty he brings back.

President Wilson takes the issue to the people in a multi-state tour, but his health fails and days after returning to Washington, he suffers a stroke. Edith shields the President and screens visitors, leading some to question how powerful she is and how much Wilson is truly acting as President. In the end, Wilson recovers enough to see the election of Republican Warren G. Harding, who has promised to keep the country out of the League of Nations; as his administration ends, he laments his failure but remains hopeful that the League will, in some form or another, be successful in the future.

Cast

Production

Development
Wilson was initially intended as a historical drama about a fictional American family living during the Progressive Era before being rewritten by Lamar Trotti into a biopic about Woodrow Wilson. Wilson's daughter, Eleanor Wilson McAdoo, served as an informal counselor. Journalist Ray Stannard Baker, an authority on Wilson, served as an adviser.

Casting
Before Knox was cast as Wilson, Ronald Colman and Frank Conroy were considered. Claudette Colbert was also considered for one of Wilson's wives. Dwight Frye was cast as Secretary of War Newton D. Baker but died of a heart attack on November 7, 1943, a few days prior to his filming start. Ernest Palmer was hired as cinematographer but had to be replaced by Leon Shamroy after falling ill, while James Basevi quit as art director due to disagreements with the rest of the crew.

Filming
With a budget of $5.2 million, Wilson was Fox's then most expensive film. Much of the costs went to constructing accurate sets for White House locations such as the East Room, the Blue Room, the Oval Office and the Lincoln Bedroom. Scenes of the Democratic National Convention were shot at Shrine Auditorium in Los Angeles while scenes set at Princeton were shot on-location in Trenton, New Jersey. Other scenes were shot at the Biltmore Theater in Los Angeles; Pueblo, Colorado; and Midwick Country Club in Alhambra, California.

Reception

Box office
Wilson was promoted by the NBC Blue Network radio show Hall of Fame Broadcast with a radio adaptation of sections of the script.

It reportedly lost $2 million for Fox. Sales were damaged due to the United States Department of War prohibiting its exhibition on Armed Forces bases during World War II under provisions of the Soldier Voting Act against the screening of political material that could influence elections such as the ones about to be held on November 7, 1944.

Responses
The film received generally positive reviews but was not without its detractors. The New Republic film critic Manny Farber was particularly unenthusiastic, calling the production "costly, tedious and impotent" while writing: "The effect of the movie is similar to the one produced by the sterile post-card albums you buy in railroad stations, which unfold like accordions and show you the points of interest in the city ... The producers must have known far more about the World War, the peace-making at Versailles, and Wilson himself, but that is kept out of the movie in the same way that slum sections are kept out of post-card albums ... About three-quarters of the way through, a large amount of actual newsreel from the first World War is run off and the strength of it makes the film that comes before and after seem comical."

President Franklin D. Roosevelt, a protege of Wilson's, screened the film for guests at the Second Quebec Conference in 1944. British Prime Minister Winston S. Churchill, however, was no fan, excusing himself mid-film before going to bed.

Awards
Despite the negative press and lackluster commercial performance, the film received ten nominations at the 17th Academy Awards, winning five:
 Best Art Direction-Interior Decoration, Color (Wiard Ihnen and Thomas Little)
 Best Cinematography, Color (Leon Shamroy)
 Best Film Editing (Barbara McLean)
 Best Sound, Recording (E. H. Hansen)
 Best Writing, Original Screenplay (Lamar Trotti)

Wilson was also nominated for:
 Best Picture (Darryl F. Zanuck)
 Best Director (Henry King)
 Best Actor in a Leading Role (Alexander Knox)
 Best Music, Scoring of a Dramatic or Comedy Picture (Alfred Newman)
 Best Effects, Special Effects (Fred Sersen and Roger Heman Sr.)

Preservation
The Academy Film Archive preserved Wilson in 2006.

References

External links
 
 
 
 
 

1944 films
1940s historical films
1940s biographical films
American biographical films
American historical films
Films about Woodrow Wilson
Films shot in New Jersey
Films shot in Washington, D.C.
Films that won the Best Sound Mixing Academy Award
Films whose art director won the Best Art Direction Academy Award
Films whose writer won the Best Original Screenplay Academy Award
Films whose cinematographer won the Best Cinematography Academy Award
Films whose editor won the Best Film Editing Academy Award
Films featuring a Best Drama Actor Golden Globe winning performance
20th Century Fox films
Films directed by Henry King
Films produced by Darryl F. Zanuck
Films with screenplays by Lamar Trotti
Films scored by Alfred Newman
Films set in the 1910s
American World War I films
Cultural depictions of Woodrow Wilson
Cultural depictions of Georges Clemenceau
Cultural depictions of David Lloyd George
Films set in Baltimore
Films set in Washington, D.C.
Films set in the White House
Films set in Paris
Films set in New Jersey
Films shot in Los Angeles County, California
1940s English-language films
1940s American films